Amber Smith is an American actress and former model.

Early life
Amber Smith is the daughter of Carol Smith. During her 2008 and 2009 appearances on the reality television programs in which she sought treatment by Dr. Drew Pinsky for addiction, she stated that both her father and mother had long histories with addiction. In the third episode of Sex Rehab with Dr. Drew, she stated that her father died as a result of a drinking problem, and that while he was absent during much of her childhood, she was still devastated by his death.

Career

Modeling
Smith started modeling by age 16. As a teenager she was represented by Irene Marie Models in Miami Beach and traveled to Paris, France, where she worked as a model throughout Europe for four years. Her breakthrough came when her naturally blonde hair was dyed red, giving her a strong resemblance to 1940s and '50s movie star Rita Hayworth. Smith appeared in back-to-back issues of the 1993 & 1994  Sports Illustrated Swimsuit Issue, and became Esquire magazine's first Vargas Girl of the 1990s. She also became the first model of the Wonderbra campaign. She later posed for photographer Helmut Newton for a Wolford advertising campaign, and was the model for the 2002 lingerie campaign for Venus Victoria, the European sister company to Victoria's Secret.

Smith has appeared on the covers of the fashion magazines and women's magazines Vogue, Elle, Cosmopolitan, Marie Claire, MAX (Australian and French editions) and YM. She was the cover girl for the March 1995 issue of Playboy. She was photographed by Clifford Wright for Maxim''' and Ocean Drive. She has appeared in advertising for L'Oréal makeup, Buffalo Jeans, Camel cigarettes, Kahlúa liqueur, Volkswagen automobiles, and Panama Jack, among others, and has walked the runway for such fashion designers as Chanel and Jean Paul Gaultier.

Acting
Smith was cast in her first film role in Paul Mazursky's Faithful, on a referral from Robert De Niro that stemmed from her Casino auditions. She also appeared in  The Funeral, directed by Abel Ferrara, and Barbra Streisand's The Mirror Has Two Faces. She played Susan Lefferts, a Rita Hayworth lookalike, in Curtis Hanson's L.A. Confidential. Smith's resemblance to Hayworth came into play again with a role in HBO's cable telefilm The Rat Pack.  She also had a role in American Beauty. Her biggest role to date has been as the star of the Cinemax TV series Sin City Diaries, which debuted in 2007.  She played Angelica, a Las Vegas entertainment consultant who plans activities for casinos' high-roller guests. 

Reality television appearances
Smith appeared as a cast member during the second season of the VH1 television show Celebrity Rehab, which depicted her 16-year struggle with opiate and alcohol addiction. She subsequently appeared in the 2009 series Sober House, a Celebrity Rehab spin-off focusing on a sober living environment. That same year, she appeared in the VH1 series Sex Rehab with Dr. Drew. During these appearances, she recounted hers and her mother's histories with addiction and co-dependency, which began when Smith was a teenager, and how her experiences with date rape and prostitution played a part in those addictions.

That same year, Smith and other alumni of Celebrity Rehab appeared as panel speakers to a new group of addicts at the Pasadena Recovery Center. Her appearance, which marked a year and a half of sobriety for her, was aired in the third-season episode "Triggers".

Personal life
In a January 2010 TV Guide story on Celebrity Rehab'', Dr. Drew Pinsky stated she was living with her mother in Los Angeles, and "doing stupendous work...She's someone who reaches out and is an inspiration and of service to other patients."

Legal matters
Smith's name surfaced in connection with the January 2008 bankruptcy of the entertainment payroll firm Axium. A lawsuit alleged the company's partners misused funds by renting a Los Angeles, California apartment for Smith, paying for her car and issuing "numerous large payments" to Smith, which they explained by calling her a "consultant" to the company.

Filmography

References

External links 
 
 

Living people
American television actresses
American film actresses
American female models
Participants in American reality television series
20th-century American actresses
21st-century American actresses
Year of birth missing (living people)